is the title of a yaoi manga by Temari Matsumoto. The manga is licensed in the United States by BLU, the Boys Love branch of Tokyopop, and was released in Germany by Egmont Manga in 2007.

Plot
Aoyama, who is the student council president of Woods ka Hill High School, and Vice President Akabane are the best friends. Although they intend to be ordinary friends each other, for some reason those around them gossip that they are "well-matched couple." One day, Aoyama kisses Akabane on the pretext of an experiment...

Manga

Reception
Carlo Santos, writing for Anime News Network, disliked the 'recycling' of character designs between stories, and felt that the plots were also repetitive. Katja Bürk, writing for animePRO, described the tales as "typical shonen-ai stories". Leroy Douresseaux described the stories as "well done stereotypical seme/uke tales" and finding them " oh-so-fun to read". Michelle Smith found the age differences in some stories "disturbing", but found other stories uninteresting.

References

External links

Manga anthologies
2004 manga
Tokyopop titles
Yaoi anime and manga